Venom is a fictional character primarily voiced by Tom Hardy appearing in the Sony's Spider-Man Universe (SSU) media franchise, based on the Marvel Comics character of the same name. Introduced in Venom (2018), Venom is depicted as a symbiote who binds with human investigative journalist Eddie Brock after landing on Earth, with the duo subsequently becoming a vigilante jointly known by Venom's name, and later as the Lethal Protector, facing Venom's former team leader, Riot, and later his son, Carnage, in combat. They are the second incarnation of the character in film, after Topher Grace and Tobey Maguire's respective portrayals of Eddie Brock / Venom and a symbiote-enveloped Spider-Man in Spider-Man 3 (2007).

, the character has appeared in three films: Venom, Venom: Let There Be Carnage (2021), and an uncredited cameo appearance in the web series Chen's Market and the Marvel Cinematic Universe (MCU) film Spider-Man: No Way Home (both 2021). Hardy will reprise his role in a third film. While Hardy's portrayal of the character in Venom was met with a mixed critical reception, the chemistry between Eddie Brock and Venom received praise.

Concept and creation 
The idea of giving Spider-Man a new costume was conceived by Randy Schueler, a Marvel Comics reader from Norridge, Illinois. In 1982, Schueler was sent a letter by editor-in-chief Jim Shooter, who acknowledged interest in his idea, with Shooter coming up with the idea of a black-and-white costume. "The Alien Costume" first appeared in The Amazing Spider-Man #252 (May 1984), before fully appearing as Venom in the 300th issue.

Venom's subsequent host, Eddie Brock, was created for the 300th issue of The Amazing Spider-Man in May 1988 due to cultural sensibilities of David Michelinie's suggestion of a villain consisting of the alien symbiote grafted into the body of a human female that forced him to conceive a male character by editor Jim Salicrup. Brock was later retconned to have a first appearance as a hand in Web of Spider-Man #18 (September 1986), but officially debuting in The Amazing Spider-Man #300, by Michelinie and Todd McFarlane, alongside Venom, initially presented as his alter-ego rather than as a separate living being.

Post-Spider-Man 3 
By July 2008, Sony Pictures was actively developing a spin-off film based on Venom alongside direct sequels to Spider-Man 3 (2007), hoping the character could "add longevity" to the franchise in a similar fashion to Wolverine in 20th Century Fox's X-Men films. Industry insiders suggested Topher Grace, who portrayed Brock in Spider-Man 3, should return for the spin-off because "the likeable actor could be a sympathetic evildoer", in response, McFarlane suggested that a Venom film could not do well with a villain as the central character.

In December 2013, Sony revealed plans to use The Amazing Spider-Man 2 (2014) to establish their own expanded universe based on the Marvel properties they had the film rights to, including Venom. Since the film underperformed, in February 2015, Sony and Marvel Studios announced a partnership that would see Marvel Studios produce the next Spider-Man film for Sony, and integrate the character into the Marvel Cinematic Universe (MCU). Sony still planned to produce the spin-off films on their own, but by November Sony had been focused on its new reboot with Marvel Studios and were believed to have been canceled.

Revival and casting 

In March 2016, Sony revived the Venom film, being envisioned as a standalone film launching its own franchise unrelated to Sony and Marvel Studios' MCU Spider-Man films. In May 2017, Sony announced that Tom Hardy would star as Eddie Brock / Venom in the film, officially beginning a new shared universe that was later titled "Sony's Spider-Man Universe". The casting of Hardy, whose son was a big fan of Venom, happened quickly after he had left Triple Frontier (2019) in April and Sony saw "an opportunity to court an in-demand talent". Brad Venable provided additional voiceover for Venom's pain and grunting sounds in Venom, his voice being combined with Hardy's for some dialogue, such as "We are Venom". Hardy signed on for three Venom films, which included Venom: Let There Be Carnage (2021).

After the Let There Be Carnage mid-credits scene showed Brock and Venom being transported from their universe into the MCU, many commentators expected Hardy to reprise his roles in the MCU film Spider-Man: No Way  Home (2021). Hardy ultimately appeared as Brock in the film's mid-credits scene, though there had been discussions about integrating him into the film's final battle. The character unknowingly leaves a piece of the Venom symbiote behind in the MCU at the end of the scene.

Characterization 
Venom director Ruben Fleischer said that unlike a werewolf or Jekyll and Hyde, the relationship between Venom and Brock is a "hybrid", with the two characters sharing a body and working together. Hardy was drawn to this duality, and compared the pair to the animated characters Ren and Stimpy. Hardy gave Eddie an "aw-shucks American accent" while using a "James Brown lounge lizard"-like voice for Venom, that was later "modulated to sound more sinister". Hardy called Venom an antihero who would "do whatever he has to" to accomplish a goal. Let There Be Carnage director Andy Serkis described the pair in the "Odd Couple stage" of their relationship, with Venom trapped in Brock's body and just wanting to be the "Lethal Protector" which distracts Eddie from work and putting his life back together.

Relationship with Eddie Brock 
Kate Gardner of The Mary Sue wondered whether Venom had been "queer-coded", a term referring to character appearing queer without their sexuality being a part of the story. Gardner soon noticed fan art depicting Brock and Venom as a couple appearing across social media sites, acknowledging that there were several moments throughout the film that implied such a relationship, including Venom turning against his species because of his time with Brock and deciding to french kiss Brock while transferring from Weying to him. Many of the fans posting the art and discussing the characters' relationship online began using the name "Symbrock" to refer to them. Amanda Brennan, lead of Tumblr's Fandometrics analysis team, said that "Symbrock" fans existed before the film due to comics, but the increase in popularity was "undoubtedly" due to the film's portrayal of the characters which she said made Venom's dialogue more "casual" compared to how he speaks in comics, adding Brennan that dialogue such as "I am Venom and you are mine" was deemed to be particularly romantic by these fans, as was the idea that Venom be seen not as a parasite but as someone who "chose [Eddie] Brock and has a connection to [Eddie] Brock".

When Sony began advertising the home media release of the film by presenting it as a romantic comedy focused on Brock and Venom's relationship, io9 Charles Pulliam-Moore said it was the treatment the film deserved, attributing the change in strategy from the studio to the audience's response to the relationship. He added that it was rare for a film studio to "get on top of a so-so ad campaign" by adjusting towards the public's "reaction to a movie", believing it to have been successful. Michael Walsh at Nerdist agreed with Pulliam-Moore, describing the move as "fully embrac[ing] 'Symbrock'" and calling it "brilliant". Walsh said that though the advertisement was clearly a parody, it also "feels like a far more accurate portrayal of what the movie was really like than the initial [marketing] hinted at", and further highlighted the kissing scene.

Fictional character biography

Bonding with Eddie Brock 

After being brought to Earth on a space shuttle by astronaut John Jameson as part of an invasion force of symbiotic lifeforms led by Riot, Venom and his team are captured by the Life Foundation, who bring them to San Francisco to begin a series of human trials in an attempt to achieve "symbiosis" and bind them to living beings, while Riot himself is stranded in Malaysia. Six months later, Venom is freed by an oblivious Eddie Brock as he attempts to free Maria, a homeless acquaintance of his whom Venom has been bound to. Transferring to Eddie's body, leaving Maria dead, Venom escapes the facility, while his two brethren die. As he begins to hear Venom's voice, Eddie reaches out to his ex-fiancée Anne Weying and her new boyfriend, Dr. Dan Lewis, for help and Lewis discovers the symbiote on examining Eddie. After Eddie is attacked by Life Foundation mercenaries to retrieve the symbiote, Venom manifests around his body as a monstrous creature that fights off the attackers and formally introduces himself to Eddie, declaring that "I am Venom, and you are mine."

After explaining their origins to Eddie, Venom assists him in breaking into his old workplace in order to turn in evidence of Life Foundation CEO Carlton Drake's numerous crimes, marveling at the cityscape of San Francisco after climbing atop a skyscraper. Subsequently, surrounded by SWAT officers alerted to the break-in, Venom and Eddie are forced to fight to escape, witness by Anne, who uses a MRI machine to separate Eddie from Venom, Dan having concluded that Venom's presence in Eddie's body is killing him: Venom subsequently explains that he would require sustenance from elsewhere to maintain a host, and it was the Life Foundation's decision not to feed him that led to his previous hosts' deaths. After Eddie is captured by Drake, now bonded to Riot (having found his way into the country through several hosts), who is in search of Venom, Anne bonds with Venom herself to free Eddie, who returns to Eddie's body by lifting him up and kissing him. Admitting that he is seen as a "loser" like Eddie on his home planet, Venom decides to abandon the Symbiotes' invasion and prevent Drake and Riot from using a rocket to return to the comet their species came from to acquire reinforcements, instead causing it to explode and kill them, with Venom apparently sacrificing himself to save Eddie. After the incident, Eddie returns to journalism, still secretly bound to Venom without Anne's knowledge, setting out to protect San Francisco by killing criminals. Confronting a criminal who had been extorting local convenience store owner Mrs. Chen, the duo devours him, declaring that "We are Venom." Sometime later, Eddie and Venom help Mrs. Chen film television advertisements for her store, holding her video camera for her before Venom expresses interest in eating Mrs. Chen's model.

Fighting Carnage 

One year later, after Eddie visits incarcerated serial killer Cletus Kasady to interview him, Venom can figure out where Kasady has hidden the bodies of victims, which gives Eddie a huge career boost. After Kasady subsequently invites Eddie to attend his execution by lethal injection, Venom is provoked to attack Kasady via insults towards Eddie. After briefly witnessing Venom's true form, Kasady bites Eddie's hand, unknowingly ingesting a small part of Venom as they reproduce. Eddie is then contacted by Anne, who tells him that she is now engaged to Dan, much to Venom's displeasure.

Wanting more freedom to eat human brains instead of chicken brains, Venom has an argument with Eddie, and the two end up fighting until the symbiote detaches from his body; they go their different ways. Venom makes his way through San Francisco by hopping from body to body and attending a rave until Anne finds him at Mrs. Chen's store and convinces him to forgive Eddie. She bonds with Venom herself to break Eddie out of a police station after he is arrested on suspicion of aiding in Kasady's escape from prison, as the symbiote piece he had ingested metamorphoses into Venom's offspring "Carnage." Making amends, Venom and Eddie bond again. Arriving at a cathedral with Dan, where Kasady and his lover Frances Barrison plan to get married, after Barrison and Kasady take Anne and Officer Mulligan hostage, respectively. Venom is shocked to see Carnage ("a red one") envelop Kasady and address them as "father", seeking to eat them, refusing to fight until Eddie promises to let him eat "everybody." Venom begins to fight Carnage but is quickly overpowered, and the latter decides to kill Anne atop the cathedral. Venom manages to rescue Anne in time and provokes Barrison to use her sonic blast powers, causing both symbiotes to separate from their hosts as the cathedral collapses and the falling bell kills Barrison. Venom saves Eddie by bonding with him before the impact. Carnage tries to bond with Kasady again, but Venom devours him before biting Kasady's head off and escapes with Brock from the police, bidding farewell to Anne and Dan, and takes a tropical vacation with Brock.

Entering an alternate reality 

Later, as Venom tells Brock about the symbiotes' hive mind knowledge across universes, a blinding light transports the pair to an alternate reality where they watch J. Jonah Jameson expose Spider-Man's identity as Peter Parker and as a "murderer" on television. After leaving the hotel, Venom and Brock go to a bar and learn about the new universe and individuals such as Tony Stark, Bruce Banner, Thanos, and a major event known as the Blip. As Brock decides to go to New York and find Spider-Man, he and Venom are returned to their universe, while unknowingly leaving a piece of the Venom symbiote behind, which slowly starts moving.

Differences from the comic books 
Venom is primarily based on the 1993 Venom: Lethal Protector miniseries and the 1995 "Planet of the Symbiotes" story arc, borrowing the San Francisco setting of the former. Due to Sony and Marvel Studios' 2015 deal for Spider-Man to enter the MCU, the character could not appear in the film itself, challenging the writers to make a Venom origin story without Spider-Man. The writers and concept artists looked to the Ultimate Marvel version of Venom (created by Brian Michael Bendis and Mark Bagley), whose origin was not related to Spider-Man and similarly does not have a spider-logo engraved in their chest. Jeff Pinkner and Scott Rosenberg were told that Spider-Man could not be in the film before the initial pitch, and took the approach to try to stay faithful to the spirit of the comics even if certain elements had to be changed. Fleischer noted that Lethal Protector gave the writers a "solid foundation" to explore the more heroic side of Venom, rather than their more traditional villainous side from the Spider-Man comics.

In Let There Be Carnage, Venom's characterization takes inspiration from the 1993 "Maximum Carnage" story arc and the 1996 story arc The Venom Saga from the 1994 Spider-Man animated series. Venom's access to a symbiote hive mind allowing knowledge to be shared across the multiverse, introduced in the film's mid-credits scene as an ability common to all symbiotes, originated from Edge of Venomverse #2 (July 2017) as an ability unique to the Venomized Gwen Poole.

Reception 
Hardy's performance received mixed reception upon Venom release. He was praised as "wicked fun" and "fun to watch" by Matthew Rozsa at Salon and Time Stephanie Zacharek, respectively. Writing for Variety, Owen Gleiberman criticized Hardy's performance as acting like a "stumblebum method goof", while Soren Anderson of The Seattle Times said that Hardy was "usually excellent" but "not this time". Jake Coyle from the Associated Press was not sure whether Hardy's performance "adds up to anything" in Venom.

Accolades

Notes

References

External links 
 
 
 Venom on the Marvel Cinematic Universe Wiki
 Eddie Brock on the Marvel Cinematic Universe Wiki

Articles about multiple fictional characters
Extraterrestrial characters in films
Fictional amorphous creatures
Fictional cannibals
Fictional characters from San Francisco
Fictional characters who can stretch themselves
Fictional characters with healing abilities
Fictional characters with superhuman senses
Fictional extraterrestrial–human hybrids
Fictional outlaws
Fictional parasites and parasitoids
Fictional reporters
Fictional vigilantes
Film characters introduced in 2018
Hive minds in fiction
Marvel Comics characters who can move at superhuman speeds
Marvel Comics characters with accelerated healing
Marvel Comics characters with superhuman strength
Marvel Comics hybrids
Marvel Comics extraterrestrial superheroes
Merged fictional characters
Spider-Man film characters
Superheroes with alter egos
Venom (film series)